Organization for Popular Democracy – Labour Movement was the ruling political party in Burkina Faso. It was founded in April 1989 by the Union of Burkinabè Communists, the Revolutionary Military Organization (OMR) and factions from Communist Struggle Union - The Flame and Burkinabè Communist Group as a party based on Marxism, but strongly pragmatic, adopting the free market in its economic plan. It renounced Marxism–Leninism in March 1991.

In February 1996 the ODP-MT became a founding organization of the Congress for Democracy and Progress.

AIn the parliamentary election held on May 24, 1992, it won 48.2% of the popular vote and 70 out of 107 seats.

The ODP-MT was led by Arsène Bongnessan Yé, Nabaho Kanidoua and Roch Marc Christian Kaboré.

It published Yeelen.

Electoral history

Presidential elections

National Assembly elections

References 

Political parties established in 1989
Defunct political parties in Burkina Faso
Communist parties in Burkina Faso
Formerly ruling communist parties